The Rise of Mormonism is a 2005 book by the sociologist of religions Rodney Stark. It was reviewed in a number of scholarly journals.

Editions

References

External links
The Rise of Mormonism at the publisher's site

2005 non-fiction books
Books about Joseph Smith
Books by Rodney Stark
History books about the Latter Day Saint movement
2005 in Christianity